Jörn Koblitz (born 1961) is publisher of MetBase - the Meteorite Information Database and Bibliography of Meteoritics and Planetary Sciences and curator of the MetBase Library of Meteoritics and Planetary Sciences, located in Bremen, Germany. 

He also is co-founder and managing director of microFAB Bremen GmbH, a silicon wafer foundry active in the business field of MEMS.

As a member of the Meteoritical Society since 1983, he served in the Society's Nomenclature Committee from 1997 to 2003.

Joern received the first Meteoritical Society's Service Award in 2006.

References

[1] https://web.archive.org/web/20110716201457/http://meteoriticalsociety.org/simple_template.cfm?code=home_awardees

1961 births
German curators
Meteorites
Living people